Ruki may refer to:
Ruki sound law, a phonological law in some Indo-European branches
Ruki, Iran, a village in Razavi Khorasan Province, Iran
Ruki River, a tributary of the Congo River in the Democratic Republic of the Congo
Loki dialect or Ruki, a language spoken in the Democratic Republic of the Congo

In popular culture
Ruki, vocalist from the Japanese rock band the GazettE
Rika Nonaka, a Digimon Tamers character
Ruki, a type of Neopet

See also
Rookie